Geranium clarkei, called Clarke's geranium, is a species of flowering plant in the family Geraniaceae, native to India and cultivated for use in gardens.

It spreads by underground rhizomes, and is used for groundcover or the front of a border.

References

clarkei